Jim Arthur (born July 12, 1978) is the head strength and conditioning coach for the Chicago Bears of the National Football League.

Coaching career
Arthur began his coaching career as a student assistant at Springfield College.  He was an intern coach for the Buffalo Bills, before joining the Chicago Bears as the assistant strength and conditioning coach under Rusty Jones in 2006. Arthur followed offensive coordinator Adam Gase to the Miami Dolphins in 2016.
On February 18, 2022, he was named Head Strength and Conditioning Coach of the Chicago Bears.

References

Living people
Chicago Bears coaches
Miami Dolphins coaches
1978 births